Salvia koyamae (Shinano-akigiri) is a perennial rarely found in the wild and native to the Japanese island of Honshu, where it has a close affinity to two other salvia species: Salvia glabrescens and Salvia nipponica. It was named by Tomitaro Makino, considered the "father of Japanese botany".

Salvia koyamae has a lax habit with decumbent stems reaching 2 feet or more that appear to creep, creating a loose ground cover about 1 foot tall. The large yellow-green cordate leaves are covered with fine hairs, and are 6 in long and 5 in wide with a 5 in long petiole. Pale yellow flowers grow in whorls, spaced on an inflorescence that can reach up to 1 ft long. Few flowers are in bloom at one time, but the heart-shaped leaves and yellow flowers make for an attractive plant. Around 1990 it was grown at the University of California Botanical Garden and introduced into horticulture soon after that.

Notes

koyamae
Flora of Japan